The 2019–20 season, was SønderjyskE's 19th season as a professional football club and their 11th consecutive season in the Superliga, the top-flight of Danish football. In addition to the domestic league, the club competed in the Danish Cup.

In the Danish Cup, SønderjyskE reached the final for the first time in club history, defeating AaB by a score of 2–0 to secure the club's first major honour and a spot in the third qualifying round of the 2020–21 UEFA Europa League.

Players

Transfers

In

Out

Competitions

Overview

Danish Superliga

Results by matchday

Regular season

Relegation round

Danish Cup

Statistics

Goalscorers

Last updated: 1 July 2021

Clean sheets

Last updated: 1 July 2021

References

Danish football clubs 2020–21 season